The Signals Intelligence Agency (SIA), formerly known as the National Electronic Security Authority (NESA), is the United Arab Emirates intelligence agency. In response to alleged cyber spying on opponents of Iran's best interests by the government of Iran during 2010 and 2011, the United States assisted the United Arab Emirates in late 2011 with establishing the National Electronic Security Authority (NESA) which is the UAE's equivalent to the US NSA. Created in 2012 through a Federal Decree Law, one of its official objective is to organize the protection of the UAE's communications network and information systems.

Activities
In May 2014, the NESA launched Cyber Quest, a competition for school and university students. , CyberQuest is on its 5th edition. And it has several social media accounts that covers the competition including Twitter account and Instagram Account

A January 2019 report by Reuters revealed that the agency participated in Project Raven, a confidential initiative to help the UAE surveil other governments, militants, and human rights activists. In 2014, Project Raven helped the SIA (NESA at the time) break up an ISIS network in the UAE.

In December 2019, The New York Times reported that the SIA or other Emirati intelligence services used ToTok, a messaging app widely used by the Emirati public, to record all conversations, movements, relationships, appointments, sounds and images by the app's users.

See also
DarkMatter (company)
Project Raven
NSO Group
Stealth Falcon
George Nader
Elliott Broidy

References 

Signals intelligence agencies
Government agencies of the United Arab Emirates